Vasilios Kosyfologos (born 6 January 1982) is a retired Greek football midfielder.

References

1982 births
Living people
Greek footballers
Kalamata F.C. players
Athinaikos F.C. players
Association football midfielders
Super League Greece players